Sheikhpura is a town and a municipality in Sheikhpura district in the Indian state of Bihar. Sheikhpura is also an administrative headquarter of Sheikhpura district.

Postal code
PIN code of Sheikhpura post office is 811105. 
Postal code for Mehus is 811102.

Notable people
 Dr Sri Krishna Singh
 Sudarshan Kumar
 K.B.Sahay
 Rajo Singh
Sunila Devi
Kum Kum, Bollywood actress from Hussainabad nawab family who acted in first bhojpuri movie as lead Ganga Maiya Tohe Piyari Chadaibey and was in an important role in movie Mother India.
Aftab Alam

See also
 Sheikhpura Railway Station

References

Cities and towns in Sheikhpura district
Sheikhpura district